Singha Malai Tunnel or Poolbank Tunnel is the longest railway tunnel in Sri Lanka.

There are 46 tunnels along the Main Line between Colombo and Badulla. In the middle of the tunnel the gradient begins to 
decline, with the Kotagala railway station being approximately  lower than the Hatton railway station. 

The tunnel was designed by Sir Guilford Lindsey Molesworth, the first Director-General of Railways in Ceylon (1865-1871) and constructed by F. W. Faviell. The tunnel's construction represented a significant engineering feat at the time, as it was bored from both ends meeting in the middle. The tunnel was named the Poolbank tunnel as it runs under the Poolbank tea estate, which was established in 1880. It is also called Singha Malai tunnel, after a nearby rock formation, Singha is Tamil for 'Lion' and Malai for 'Mountain'.

References

Railway tunnels in Sri Lanka
Tunnels completed in 1885
Rail transport in Nuwara Eliya District